Landmann is a surname. Notable people with the surname include:

 Barbara Heinemann Landmann (1795–1883), German spiritual leader
 Ludwig Landmann (1868–1945), first Jewish Mayor of Frankfurt
 George Thomas Landmann (1779–1854), British civil engineer
 Salcia Landmann (1911–2002), Austrian-born Jewish writer and wife of the philosopher Michael Landmann

See also 
 Landman (disambiguation)
 Lanzmann
 Landesmann